The Anderson Peninsula is a low ice-covered peninsula,  long, terminating in Belousov Point. It lies between Gillett Ice Shelf and Suvorov Glacier on the coastal margin of the Wilson Hills of Antarctica. It was mapped by the United States Geological Survey from surveys and from U.S. Navy air photos in 1960–64, and named by the Advisory Committee on Antarctic Names for Lieutenant (later Captain) Richard E. Anderson, Civil Engineer Corps, U.S. Navy, base public works officer at McMurdo Sound during Operation Deep Freeze I and II. He wintered over in the McMurdo area during the latter operation in 1957. The peninsula is situated on the Pennell Coast, a portion of Antarctica lying between Cape Williams and Cape Adare.

References
 

Peninsulas of Antarctica
Landforms of Victoria Land
Pennell Coast